Sarlat-la-Canéda or just Sarlat is a railway station in Sarlat-la-Canéda, Dordogne, France. The station opened in 1882 and is located on the Siorac-en-Périgord - Cazoulès railway line. The station is served by TER (local) services operated by the SNCF.

Train services
The following services currently call at Sarlat:
local service (TER Nouvelle-Aquitaine) Bordeaux - Libourne - Bergerac - Le Buisson - Sarlat-la-Canéda
local service (TER Nouvelle-Aquitaine) Périgueux - Les Eysies - Le Buisson - Sarlat

Gallery

References

Railway stations in France opened in 1882
Railway stations in Dordogne